Platylesches picanini, the banded hopper, is a butterfly of the family Hesperiidae. It is found in Senegal, Gambia, Guinea, Sierra Leone, Liberia, Ivory Coast, Ghana, Nigeria, Cameroon, the Democratic Republic of the Congo, Uganda, south-western Kenya, Tanzania, Malawi, northern Zambia, Mozambique, Zimbabwe and South Africa (the Limpopo Province and Mpumalanga). The habitat consists of forests, riparian vegetation along river courses, woodland, dry forests and Guinea savanna.

The wingspan is 30–40 mm. These skippers have brown on the uppersides with small white spots on the forewings and small yellow median dashes on the hindwings. The underside wings are black with broad white or yellow median bands, as suggested by the common name. Flight period is from January to May and June to August, with two broods. Adults have been recorded feeding from flowers, including those of Eupatorium species and teak. Adult males are sometimes also attracted to bird droppings.

The larvae feed on the young foliage of Parinari curatellifolia. They are green but turn salmon pink just before pupation. The larvae construct leaf shelters by cutting a leaf at either end of the shelter and with the edge of the leaf pulled across to touch the leaf surface. The joint is closed by brown silk threads.

References

Butterflies described in 1894
Erionotini
Butterflies of Africa